HMCS Toronto (FFH 333) is a  that has served in the Canadian Forces since 1993. Toronto is the fourth ship in her class which is the name for the Canadian Patrol Frigate Project. She is the second RCN ship to be named for Canada's largest city. When not on operations she is assigned to Maritime Forces Atlantic (MARLANT) and is based at CFB Halifax. Toronto serves on MARLANT missions protecting Canada's sovereignty in the Atlantic Ocean and enforcing Canadian laws in its territorial sea and exclusive economic zone.

Description and design
In July 1983, the federal government approved the budget for the design and construction of the first batch of six new frigates of which Toronto was a part, out of twelve that were eventually built. To reflect the changing long term strategy of the Navy during the 1980s and 1990s, the Halifax-class frigates was designed as a general purpose warship with particular focus on anti-submarine capabilities.

That made them slightly larger than the Iroquois-class destroyers. The vessels are propelled by two shafts with Escher Wyss controllable pitch propellers driven by a CODOG system of two General Electric LM2500 gas turbines, generating  and one SEMT Pielstick 20 PA6 V 280 diesel engine, generating .

The Halifax class have a complement of 198 naval personnel of which 17 are officers and 17 aircrew of which 8 are officers.

Armament and aircraft
As built the Halifax-class vessels deployed the CH-124 Sea King helicopter, which acted in concert with shipboard sensors to seek out and destroy submarines at long distances from the ships. The ships have a helicopter deck fitted with a "bear trap" system allowing the launch and recovery of helicopters in up to sea state 6. The Halifax class also carries a close-in anti-submarine weapon in the form of the Mark 46 torpedo, launched from twin Mark 32 Mod 9 torpedo tubes in launcher compartments either side of the forward end of the helicopter hangar.

As built, the anti-shipping role is supported by the RGM-84 Harpoon Block 1C surface-to-surface missile, mounted in two quadruple launch tubes at the main deck level between the funnel and the helicopter hangar. For anti-aircraft self-defence the ships are armed with the Sea Sparrow vertical launch surface-to-air missile in two Mk 48 Mod 0 eight-cell launchers placed to port and starboard of the funnel. The vessels carry 16 missiles. A Raytheon/General Dynamics Phalanx Mark 15 Mod 21 Close-In Weapon System (CIWS) is mounted on top of the helicopter hangar for "last-ditch" defence against targets that evade the Sea Sparrow.

As built, the main gun on the forecastle is a /70 calibre Mark 2 gun from Bofors.

Countermeasures and sensors
The torpedo decoy is the AN/SLQ-25A Nixie towed acoustic decoy from Argon ST. The ship's radar warning receiver, the CANEWS (Canadian Electronic Warfare System), SLQ-501, and the radar jammer, SLQ-505, were developed by Thorn and Lockheed Martin Canada.

Two Thales Nederland (formerly Signaal) SPG-503 (STIR 1.8) fire control radars are installed one on the roof of the bridge and one on the raised radar platform immediately forward of the helicopter hangar. The ship is also fitted with Raytheon AN/SPS-49(V)5 long-range active air search radar operating at C and D bands, Ericsson HC150 Sea Giraffe medium-range air and surface search radar operating at G and H bands, and Kelvin Hughes Type 1007 I-band navigation radar. The sonar suite includes the CANTASS Canadian Towed Array and GD-C AN/SQS-510 hull mounted sonar and incorporates an acoustic range prediction system. The sonobuoy processing system is the GD-C AN/UYS-503.

Modernization
The Halifax class underwent a modernization program, known as the Halifax Class Modernization (HCM) program, in order to update the frigates' capabilities in combatting modern smaller, faster and more mobile threats. This involved upgrading the command and control, radar, communications, electronic warfare and armament systems. Further improvements, such as modifying the vessel to accommodate the new Sikorsky CH-148 Cyclone helicopter and satellite links will be done separately from the main Frigate Equipment Life Extension (FELEX) program.

The FELEX program comprised upgrading the combat systems integration to CMS330. The SPS-49 2D long-range air search radar was replaced by the Thales Nederland SMART-S Mk 2 E/F-band 3D surveillance radar, and the two STIR 1.8 fire-control radars were replaced by a pair of Saab Ceros 200 recontrol radars. A Telephonics IFF Mode 5/S interrogator was installed and the Elisra NS9003A-V2HC ESM system replaced the SLQ-501 CANEWS. An IBM multi-link (Link 11, Link 16 and Link 22 enabled) datalink processing system was installed along with two Raytheon Anschütz Pathfinder Mk II navigation radars. Furthermore, Rheinmetall's Multi Ammunition Softkill System (MASS), known as MASS DUERAS, was introduced to replace the Plessey Shield decoy system. The existing 57 mm Mk 2 guns were upgraded to the Mk 3 standard, the Harpoon missiles were improved to Block II levels, the Phalanx was upgraded to Block 1B, and the obsolete Sea Sparrow system was replaced by the Evolved Sea Sparrow Missile.

Service history
Toronto was laid down on 22 April 1989 by Saint John Shipbuilding Ltd. at Saint John, New Brunswick, and launched on 18 December 1990. The frigate was commissioned into the Canadian Forces on 29 July 1993 at Toronto, Ontario, and carries the hull classification symbol FFH 333.

In 1994, Toronto deployed to the Adriatic Sea in support of the NATO blockade of Yugoslavia. The same year, the ship took part in the NATO naval exercise Linked Seas off Portugal. In 1996, Toronto sailed through the St. Lawrence Seaway and the Great Lakes making several port visits.

In 1998, Toronto joined the NATO fleet STANAVFORLANT in January. On 10 February, the ship was redeployed to the Persian Gulf to assist in the enforcement of sanctions against Iraq. During the ship's deployment, the frigate served with a United States Navy fleet. The ship returned to Canada on 16 June. On 5 December, Toronto sailed to the Middle East as part of Operation Apollo in the War in Afghanistan. The ship returned to Canada on 27 May 2002. From January to July 2004, Toronto took part in Operation Altair, operating with the  Carrier Strike Group as part of a U.S.-led coalition in Operation Enduring Freedom. In summer 2005, Toronto performed another tour of the Great Lakes.

In 2009, Toronto deployed to the Caribbean Sea to perform drug-smuggling interdiction duties as part of Operation Caribbe. The ship returned to the Caribbean in 2011 as part of Operation Caribbe.

Toronto participated in Operation Artemis, commencing her first rotation (ROTO 2) in January 2013 and finishing in February 2014 (which included a crew swap in July 2013 [the first crew swap in RCN history since 1991]).

While relieving  in the Mediterranean Sea as part of Standing NATO Maritime Group 2, Toronto was reassigned to the Black Sea for Operation Reassurance in response to Russian intervention in Central and Eastern Europe. Toronto led Task Unit 2 (TU.02) and worked in concert with Spanish Navy frigate , and operated with Romanian Navy frigate Regele Ferdinand and United States Navy destroyer  as well as other vessels from Bulgaria, Georgia, Turkey, and Ukraine.

On 8 September 2014, Toronto was circled by two Russian Su-24 attack aircraft and a Russian surveillance plane in a provocative manner. In November 2014, six members of the crew helped fight a fire while on shore leave in Antalya, Turkey. While in the Mediterranean Sea, Toronto suffered a fire in its auxiliary machinery room on 25 December 2014. The fire was extinguished and all personnel affected by the smoke were treated and released. During the frigate's deployment, Toronto participated in three naval exercises and led Task Unit 2 while operating in the Black Sea.  relieved the ship in January 2015.

Toronto was the last ship of the class to complete her FELEX refit, which was performed at Irving Shipyards in Halifax. The vessel was returned to the Royal Canadian Navy on 29 November 2016 to begin sea trials. The vessel was not expected to be operational until 2017–18.

In October, Toronto was deployed to European waters. During a series of exercises in UK waters, the frigate developed a significant electrical problem that caused a loss of power to the ship. Power was later restored and Toronto was ordered to Belfast for repairs. As the frigate was docking in Belfast, a small fire began in the starboard gas turbine enclosure in the forward engine room, which was quickly extinguished by the crew. This marked the second such fire in days aboard Halifax-class frigates, the first aboard . The ship returned to Canada. On 19 January 2019, Toronto departed Halifax for the Mediterranean Sea as part of Operation Reassurance. The frigate sailed into the Black Sea and visited Odessa, Ukraine.

Toronto returned to Halifax on 4 August 2019. On 22 August 2019, a fire broke out aboard Toronto while the ship was at dock in Halifax undergoing routine maintenance. The fire broke out at roughly 6:50 pm and was extinguished within 20 minutes. No one was injured.

Images

References

Notes

Citations

Sources

External links

HMCS Toronto (FFH 333) – official website 

Fleet of the Royal Canadian Navy
Halifax-class frigates
1990 ships
Ships built in New Brunswick
Hurricane Katrina disaster relief